Mordiford is a village and civil parish in Herefordshire, England on the B4224 Hereford to Mitcheldean road 4 miles east-southeast of the city of Hereford.

This village grew up around an ancient ford over the River Lugg. The river is now crossed by the oldest surviving bridge in Herefordshire, dating in part to c. 1352 and completed in the 16th century

Mordiford is known for the legend of the Dragon of Mordiford, which, some said, would amble down from its lair in Haugh Wood to drink from the confluence of the rivers Wye and Lugg near the village.

Nearby is Sufton Court, a small Palladian mansion set in parkland.

A heart shaped corn dolly is named after the village of Mordiford.

In Mordiford, there is a pub and a primary school.

See also
List of places in Herefordshire

References

External links

 Photos of Mordiford and surrounding area on geograph
 Extract from National Gazetteer, 1868
 Description from Littlebury's Directory and Gazetteer of Herefordshire, 1876-7
 Mordiford Primary School

Villages in Herefordshire
Civil parishes in Herefordshire